Henrik Horn (Henrik Horn af Marienborg) (22 May 1618 – 22 February 1693) was a Swedish Nobleman (friherre), Admiral and member of the Privy Council of Sweden.

Biography
Henrik Horn was born at Stade in the Prince-Archbishopric of Bremen, today in Lower Saxony, Germany, into a Swedish noble family of medieval origin. He was the son of Henrik Horn (1578-1618) and was born two months after the father's death. During his youth, the city of Stade came under the rule of Sweden possession in 1628. Stade was held by the Danish from 1636 until reverting to Swedish control in 1643. Horn received a military education and pursued a military career in the service of the Royal Swedish Army. At the age of 25, he was appointed Colonel. Horn became Major General in 1654, General Lieutenant and Chief of the Finnish Army in 1657 and Field Marshal in 1665. He distinguished himself in the Polish campaign and in 1666 was appointed Governor-General of Bremen-Verden which was under a Personal union with Sweden from –1712.

As Governor-General he commanded Swedish forces in 1675/76 against the allied German armies during the Bremen-Verden Campaign, but eventually had to surrender. He was given the command of the Royal Swedish Navy in 1677 and was made a member of the Privy Council of Sweden (riksråd). That same year, he was defeated by Denmark in the Battle of Køge Bay during the Scanian War. He was appointed to the head of the College of Amiralities in 1677. In 1678, he was appointed as the Commander-in-Chief of Livonia which was a dominion of the Swedish Empire from 1629 until 1721. In 1680, Horn left Livonia and returned to help rebuild Stade which had been besieged in 1676 during the Swedish-Brandenburg War.

Personal life
Horn married in 1674 with Beata Magdalena Wittenberg.

He died during 1693 in Stade.

See also
Horn family

References

Other Sources
Horn, Henrik in Nationalencyklopedin (1992).

1618 births
1693 deaths
People from Stade
Swedish nobility
Swedish generals
17th-century Swedish politicians
Swedish admirals
17th-century Swedish military personnel